Xenothictis coena is a species of moth of the  family Tortricidae. It is found in New Caledonia.

The forewings are blackish brown with brownish cream traces of ground colour and indistinct brown markings.

References

Moths described in 1961
Archipini